Melba is a Canadian cultivar of domesticated apple, which was developed by W. T. Macoun at the Central Experimental Farm, in Ottawa, Ontario by crossing a McIntosh with a Liveland Raspberry apple. It has a yellow skin washed with crimson colour. Flesh is extremely white, firm and crisp. Flavor is sweet with hints of tart. There is also a Red Melba mutation which is more red coloured, and is ripening later in season.

This tree is very productive and can bear fruit at a young age, but has a biennial tendency and early harvest. Need high skill gardening but highly rewarded. It is mainly used for fresh eating.

Gallery

References

Apple cultivars